Agent Blue is one of the "rainbow herbicides" that is known for its use by the United States during the Vietnam War.  It contained a mixture of dimethylarsinic acid (also known as cacodylic acid) and its related salt, sodium cacodylate, and water. Largely inspired by the British use of herbicides and defoliants during the Malayan Emergency, killing rice was a military strategy from the very start of US military involvement in Vietnam. At first, US soldiers attempted to blow up rice paddies and rice stocks, using mortars and hand grenades. But grains of rice were far more durable than they understood, and were not easily destroyed. Every grain that survived was a seed to be collected and planted again.


History
A 1967 report to the International War Crimes Tribunal stated that "The soldiers discovered that rice is one of the most maddeningly difficult substances to destroy; using thermite metal grenades it is almost impossible to make it burn and, even if one succeeds in scattering the rice, this does not stop it being harvested by patient men." The purpose of Agent Blue was to kill narrow-leafed plants and trees (grass, rice, bamboo, banana, etc.)  "Operation Ranch Hand", was military code for spraying of herbicides from U.S. Air Force aircraft in Southeast Asia from 1962 through 1971. The widespread use of herbicides in Southeast Asia during the Vietnam War was a unique military operation in that it was meant to kill the plants that provided cover. The continued use of Agent Blue and the other "Rainbow Herbicides" by the United States was primarily meant as an operation to take away the enemy's advantage on the terrain as well as deprive them of food.

Between 1962 and 1971, the US used an estimated 20 million gallons of herbicides as chemical weapons for "defoliation and crop destruction" which fell mostly on the forest of South Vietnam, but was eventually used in Laos as well to kill crops in order to deprive the communist Viet Cong and North Vietnamese troops of food. It was sprayed on rice paddies and other crops in an attempt to deprive the Viet Cong of the valuable crops the plants provided. Agent Blue is chemically unrelated to the more infamous Agent Orange and other herbicides used during the war.

Agent Blue affects plants by causing them to dry out. As rice is highly dependent on water to live, using Agent Blue on these paddies can destroy an entire field and leave it unsuitable for further planting. This is why Agent Blue was also used where food was not a factor, but the foliage was. The Vietcong had an advantage while fighting in Vietnam because they were used to the abundance of plant life on the battlefield. The US found themselves at a disadvantage and based on the precedent set by the British in Malaya, decided that the best retaliation would be to take the Vietcong's advantage away from them by removing their cover. Along roads, canals, railroads, and other transportation networks, Ranch Hand cleared several hundred yards using the herbicides to make ambushes more difficult for their enemies. In Laos, the herbicide removed the jungle canopy from the roads and trails used for infiltrating men and supplies, making them more vulnerable to attack from the air.

Approximately 4 million gallons of Agent Blue were used in Vietnam during the war. From 1965 on the Ansul Chemical Company delivered the herbicide Phytar 560 with the 26.4% sodium cacodylate and 4.7% cacodylic acid in water.

Cacodylic acid is still used on crops throughout the USA.  Taken from ZNet Ecology in 1983: “It has been over twelve years since the last herbicide mission that was done. But there is still big controversy going around about the past missions that were sent out.“

References

Arsenical herbicides
Defoliants
Military equipment of the Vietnam War